Romanian Venezuelans are Venezuelans of Romanian descent or a Romania-born person who resides in Venezuela.

The Romanian Immigration in Venezuela started well into the 20th century and deepened in the 1990s.
 
The Romanian community in Venezuela is around 10,000 people. They are mostly immigrants who arrived in the country, like many other European nationalities, following the Second World War and the policies of the governments of the Warsaw Pact. Romanians became adjusted to Venezuelan society, because Romanian and Spanish belong to Romance languages, as well as Romanians' Latin identity.

The community is organized into various associations such as Casa Rumana de Venezuela. The Romanian Orthodox Church operates in Caracas since 1997. The same year was built the Church of St. Constantine and Helena in the city.

Notable people

 Joana Benedek - model and telenovela actress.
 Jacques Braunstein - musician, economist, publicist and disc jockey.
 Paul Georgescu - hydraulic engineer. Emeritus professor of Simon Bolivar University.
 Sofia Imber - journalist and cultural promoter, creator of the Museo de Arte Contemporáneo de Caracas.
 Lya Imber - first woman in Venezuela to earn the degree of Doctor of Medical Sciences.
 Moisés Kaufman - playwright, director and founder of Tectonic Theater Project.
 Cornelio Popescu - former mayor of Chacao
 Thea Segall - photographer

See also
 Romanians
 Romanian diaspora
 Immigration to Venezuela
 Romanian Orthodox Church of Caracas

Notes
.

 
European Venezuelan
Venezuela